The Green Caravan is a 1922 British silent drama film directed by Edwin J. Collins and starring Catherine Calvert, Gregory Scott and Valia.

Cast
 Catherine Calvert as Gypsy 
 Gregory Scott as Hugo Drummond 
 Valia as Lillian Vesey 
 Ivo Dawson as Lord Listane 
 Wallace Bosco as Sir Simeon Marks 
 Sunday Wilshin as Maisie Gay 
 Harry Newman as Hiram J. Mutt

References

Bibliography
 Low, Rachael. History of the British Film, 1918-1929. George Allen & Unwin, 1971.

External links

1922 films
1922 drama films
British silent feature films
British drama films
Films directed by Edwin J. Collins
1920s English-language films
1920s British films
Silent drama films